Henry Leonardus van den Houten (1801-17 February 1879), was a Dutch-Australian painter, lithographer and art teacher.

Van den Houten was born in the Hague, Netherlands in 1801 and produced portraits in the Netherlands before emigrating in 1853, with his family, to Victoria, Australia. In Australia, he was employed as a drawing master and an art teacher, and his work was displayed at the Victorian Intercolonial Exhibition in 1875. He died in St Kilda, Victoria and was buried at the St Kilda Cemetery.

References

1801 births
1879 deaths
Dutch painters
Dutch male painters